Benjamin Alarie (born 1977) is a Canadian jurist, law professor, and entrepreneur. He serves as Professor at the University of Toronto Faculty of Law, where he also holds the Osler Chair in Business Law. He is an author of many publications in the domain of taxation and constitutional law with respect to issues of taxation and fiscal federalism. Alarie is co-founder and CEO of Blue J Legal, a legal software company based in Toronto, Canada.

Education
Benjamin Alarie attended Wilfrid Laurier University, a public university in Waterloo, where he received his B.A. in 1999. In 1999, Alarie entered the University of Toronto, where he was a junior fellow at Massey College. In 2002, he graduated from the University of Toronto with an M.A in economics and a J.D. with honours. Continuing his graduate studies at Yale Law School, he received his Master of Laws (LL.M.) in 2003.

Career

Law practice and academic career
Alarie's research and academic interests include taxation law, judicial decision-making and practical use of artificial intelligence in the field of jurisprudence. In 2003, Alarie began his legal career as a law clerk for Madam Justice Louise Arbour at the Supreme Court of Canada. In 2004, Alarie joined the University of Toronto’s Faculty of Law as a full-time professor. He was awarded the Alan Mewett QC Prize for excellence in teaching by the law school's graduating class of 2009. Alarie is an affiliated faculty member of the Vector Institute for Artificial Intelligence. He is a coauthor of a textbook on tax law, Canadian Income Tax Law, including the most recent 6th edition published in 2018. He is co-author of the peer-reviewed book, The Legal Singularity: How Artificial Intelligence Can Make Law Radically Better (University of Toronto Press, 2023).

Blue J Legal
In 2015, Alarie co-founded (along with Brett Janssen, Anthony Niblett and Albert Yoon) Blue J Legal, a Toronto-based legal tech startup company specializing in legal analysis for tax and employment law experts.

According to a number of sources, the company's software uses AI and machine learning algorithms to assist with legal research by analyzing large amounts of data to predict a court's likely verdict in various kinds of legal cases. The company's AI software program Tax Foresight was used in 2018 in a pilot program organized by The Department of Justice in Canada and has subsequently been adopted. The Canada Revenue Agency has also adopted Blue J's software.

Notable publications 
Benjamin Alarie, Anthony Niblett, Albert H Yoon, "How artificial intelligence will affect the practice of law"
Benjamin Alarie, Anthony Niblett, Albert H Yoon, "Law in the future"
Benjamin Alarie, "The path of the law: Towards legal singularity"

Benjamin Alarie, "Turning Standards into Rules Part 1: Using Machine Learning to Predict Tax Outcomes" 
Benjamin Alarie, "Turning Standards into Rules Part 2: How Do Financial Risk Factors Affect Debt vs. Equity Determinations?" 
Benjamin Alarie, "Turning Standards into Rules—Part 3: Behavioral Control Factors in Employee vs. Independent Contractor Decisions" 
Benjamin Alarie, "Turning Standards into Rules Part 4: Machine Learning and Economic Substance" 
Benjamin Alarie, "Turning Standards into Rules—Part 5: Weighing the Factors in Capital Gains vs. Ordinary Income Decisions" 
Benjamin Alarie, "The Path of the Law: Toward Legal Singularity" 
Benjamin Alarie and David Duff, "The Legacy of UK Tax Concepts in Canadian Income Tax Law" [2008] British Tax Review 228.
Benjamin Alarie, "Mutual Misunderstanding in Contract" (2009) 46(4) American Business Law Journal 531.
Benjamin Alarie and Andrew James Green, "The Reasonable Justice: An Empirical Analysis of Justice Frank Iacobucci's Career on the Supreme Court of Canada" (2007) 57 University of Toronto Law Journal 195.
Benjamin Alarie and Andrew James Green, "Policy Preference Change and Appointments to the Supreme Court of Canada" (2009) 47(1) Osgoode Hall Law Journal

References

External links 

 Benjamin Alarie on Google Scholar
 Profile in Toronto Life magazine
 Benjamin Alarie profile at University of Toronto
 SSRN profile

1977 births
Living people
Canadian legal scholars
People from Kitchener, Ontario
University of Toronto alumni
University of Toronto Faculty of Law alumni
Academic staff of the University of Toronto Faculty of Law
Wilfrid Laurier University alumni
Yale Law School alumni